The 2017–18 Russian National Football League was the 26th season of Russia's second-tier football league since the dissolution of the Soviet Union. The season began on 8 July 2017 and ended on 12 May 2018.

Teams

Stadiums, personnel and sponsorship

League table

Results

Statistics

Top goalscorers

Last updated: 25 November 2017

References

External links
Official website

2017–18 in Russian football leagues
Russian First League seasons
Rus